Amelia Reid (November 13, 1924 – March 3, 2001) was a pilot, flight instructor, businesswoman, airshow performer, and airport advocate.

In 1960, Reid founded Amelia Reid Aviation, a flight school at Reid-Hillview Airport in San Jose, California.  She ran the business out of her 1959 Ford and, later, out of two trailers.  She mortgaged her home and constructed a permanent hangar and office building in 1967, from which she operated her flight school for the rest of her life.

Reid logged over 55,000 flight hours and trained more than 4,000 pilots.  She flew in countless airshows, her last at age 75 in a Cessna Aerobat.  She won the Aircraft Owners and Pilots Association Lawrence P. Sharples Award and was inducted into the National Association of Flight Instructors Hall of Fame.

Reid's students include noted airshow performer Sean D. Tucker, aviation author and speaker Rod Machado, aerospace engineer and author H. Paul Shuch (whose recurring fictional character Avalon Eden  is based in part on Reid), and Jason Dahl, the captain on United flight 93 on September 11, 2001.

References

External links 
 AeroDynamic Aviation, formerly Amelia Reid Aviation

1924 births
2001 deaths
Aerobatic pilots
Businesspeople from California
American women aviators
American flight instructors
American women flight instructors
Aviators from California
20th-century American businesspeople
20th-century American women